Illuktenna may refer to:

 Illuktenna (7°10'N 80°55'E), a village in Sri Lanka
 Illuktenna (7°22'N 80°55'E), a village in Sri Lanka